The 2002–2003 FINA Swimming World Cup was a series of nine, international short course (25m) swimming meets organized by FINA. The meets were held in seven different cities, from November 2002 through January 2003. Each featured 34 events: 17 for males, 17 for females.

Meets
Dates and locations for the 2002-03 World Cup meets were:

Event winners

50 freestyle

100 freestyle

200 freestyle

400 freestyle

1500/800 freestyle

50 backstroke

100 backstroke

200 backstroke

50 breaststroke

100 breaststroke

200 breaststroke

50 butterfly

100 butterfly

200 butterfly

100 Individual Medley

200 Individual Medley

400 Individual Medley

References

FINA Swimming World Cup
2002 in swimming
2003 in swimming